Baba Ahmad may refer to:
 Baba Ahmad, Isfahan
 Ahmadabad, Andika, Khuzestan Province
 Emamzadeh Baba Ahmad, Khuzestan Province
 Baba Ahmad, Kohgiluyeh and Boyer-Ahmad
 Baba Ahmad, West Azerbaijan